CICO is the abbreviation of:

 Chongqing International Construction Corporation, a Chinese construction and engineering company
 One of TVOntario's call signs
 Calorie in, calorie out